The AX15 built by Aisin was used in Jeeps with the AMC 242 (4.0L) Inline 6 engine, as well as the AMC 258 (4.2L) Inline 6 engine and AMC (2.5L) Straight 4 engine. This included vehicles such as the Cherokee(XJ), Comanche (MJ), and Wrangler (YJ and TJ) as well as the 2nd generation of the Dodge Dakota. Starting in 1988 (mid-year) and was used in the Cherokee and Wrangler models until 1999 when it was replaced with the NV3550. 

The AX15 had a 23 spline output shaft and a mated to the NP231 as well as the NP207 transfercase. Between 1988 and 1993 the transmission featured an internal slave cylinder, the next year (1994) the transmission was redesigned to have an external slave cylinder for easier maintenance. All versions of the AX15 feature brass synchronizer rings and require API GL-3 lubricant.

References

Aisin transmissions